Grover Xavier "G.X." McSherry (November 23, 1924 – May 5, 2013) was an American farmer, rancher, and politician.

Background 
Born in Dwyer, New Mexico, McSherry was a farmer and rancher. He served in the New Mexico House of Representatives for the 32nd district from 1982 to 1998 as a Democrat.

References

1924 births
2013 deaths
People from Grant County, New Mexico
People from Luna County, New Mexico
Democratic Party members of the New Mexico House of Representatives